This is a list of Hindi language television channels.

Government-Owned Channels

Defunct Channels

General Entertainment

Upcoming Channels

Defunct Channels

Movies

Defunct Channels

Music

Defunct Channels

Youth

Defunct Channels

Kids

Defunct Channels

Infotainment & Lifestyle

Defunct Channels

News

National News Channels

Regional News Channels

Bihar and Jharkhand

Madhya Pradesh and Chhattisgarh

Uttar Pradesh and Uttarakhand

Rajasthan
Jan TV
First India News Rajasthan
India News Rajasthan
News18 Rajasthan
Zee Rajasthan

Haryana
India News Haryana
OK India

Maharashtra
Awaaz India

Business News Channels
Zee Business
CNBC Awaaz
ET Now Swadesh

Defunct Channels
Aajtak Tez
Dilli Aaj Tak

Religious
Aastha TV
Channel Divya
Darshan 24
Hare Krsna TV
Katyayani
Lord Buddha TV
Mahavira TV
Mangal Kalash
Sanskar TV
Soham TV
Tulsi TV
Vrinda Tv
Vrindavan TV

Defunct Channel
Zee Jagran

Sports
Star sports 3
DD Sports
Eurosport
Sony Ten 3
Sports18 Khel
Star Sports 1 Hindi
Star Sports First

Defunct Channels
ESPN India
NEO Cricket
NEO Sports
Sony Kix
Sony ESPN

See also

List of 4K channels in India
List of HD channels in India

Hindi
Lists of television channels in India

Hindi language-related lists